Patang ('Kite') is a 1993 Indian Hindi-language drama film directed by Goutam Ghose, starring Shabana Azmi, Shafiq Syed, Om Puri and  Rabi Ghosh. It is set in small railway station near Gaya and shows the lives of people in illegal slums near it. The film was shot in Gaya and Manpur in Bihar.

At the 41st National Film Awards (for 1993), Patang won the award for Best Feature Film in Hindi. At the Taormina Film Fest, Shabana Azmi won the Best Actress Award.
Child actor Shafiq Syed, who played the lead role of Krishna (Chaipau) in Mira Nair's Academy Award-nominated film Salaam Bombay! (1988), acted in the film. This was the only other one he did.

Cast

 Shabana Azmi as Jitni
 Shafiq Syed as Somra
 Om Puri as Mathura
 Rabi Ghosh
 Abul Khair
 Mohan Agashe
 Kamlesh Kunti Singh 
 Ashad Sinha
 Shatrughan Sinha as Rabbani
 Durba Sahay as Collector's Wife

References

External links 
 

1993 films
1990s Hindi-language films
Indian drama films
Films shot in India
Films set in Bihar
Films shot in Bihar
Films about poverty in India
Best Hindi Feature Film National Film Award winners
Indian avant-garde and experimental films
1990s avant-garde and experimental films
Films directed by Goutam Ghose
1993 drama films
Hindi-language drama films